This is a list of things named after A. P. J. Abdul Kalam, the Indian aerospace scientist who served as the 11th President of India from 25 July 2002 to 25 July 2007.

Science

Bacterium
Solibacillus kalamii , a gram-positive, rod-shaped, and aerobic bacterium is named after A. P. J. by the International Space Station.

Places
Mount Kalam, a 6,180 metres high peak located near the Bara Shigri Glacier in Himachal Pradesh.
Dr. A.P.J. Abdul Kalam Road, a road in New Delhi. The renaming was criticised by the historians citing "New Delhi's geography was inspired by history, not politics and bigotry".
A.P.J. Abdul Kalam Island, an island in the Bay of Bengal.
Dr. A.P.J. Abdul Kalam Memorial : Mausoleum of A. P. J. Abdul Kalam.

Institutions
Dr APJ Abdul Kalam Missile Complex, a military research institute in Hyderabad, India.
A.P.J. Abdul Kalam Centre, a state-sponsored organization in Assam state.
Dr Kalam Agricultural College, an agriculture college at Kishanganj of Bihar State.
Higher Education and Skill Education Guarantee Scheme (HESEGS), an educational institute or a government program in Delhi.

Colleges and universities

Dr. A.P.J. Abdul Kalam University, a private university in Indore, Madhya Pradesh.
APJ Abdul Kalam Technological University, a state university in Thiruvananthapuram, Kerala.
Dr. A.P.J. Abdul Kalam Technical University, a public collegiate university in Lucknow, Uttar Pradesh. 
Dr. A.P.J. Abdul Kalam Government College, government college in New Town, Kolkata.
Dr. A.P.J. Abdul Kalam Government Arts and Science College, a college in Rameswaram, Tamil Nadu.
Dr. A.P.J. Abdul Kalam Science City, a government research center in Bihar.
Dr. APJ Abdul Kalam UIT Jhabua, a public college in Madhya Pradesh.

Holidays 
World Students' Day, 79th birthday of Abdul Kalam, internationally recognized by the United Nations.

Political parties 
Abdul Kalam Vision India Party, a political party launched on 28 February 2016.

Awards
Dr. A. P. J. Abdul Kalam Award, an award instituted by the government of Tamil Nadu.

Proposed renamings
Space Science Museum located at Kakkanad.

References

Kalam,Abdul
A. P. J. Abdul Kalam